The Andean small-eared shrew (Cryptotis avia) is a species of mammal in the family Soricidae. It is endemic to Colombia.

References
 Insectivore Specialist Group 1996.  Cryptotis avia.   2006 IUCN Red List of Threatened Species.   Downloaded on 30 July 2007.

Cryptotis
Endemic fauna of Colombia
Mammals of Colombia
Taxa named by Glover Morrill Allen
Mammals described in 1923
Taxonomy articles created by Polbot